Bentelo (Low German: Beantel) is a farming village in the Dutch municipality Hof van Twente.

Overview 
It was first mentioned in 1188 as Benlo. The etymology is unclear. Bentelo started to develop after World War II. The Catholic church was completed in 1954. In 1840, it was home to 504 people.

The village is a centre for intensive cattle farming. Bentelo has a large vineyard in the Netherlands, as well as several Asparagus growers.

Notable people
Klaas Annink (Huttenkloas) (1710–1775), criminal from Twente. Place of birth is disputed
Moniek Kleinsman (born 1982), speed skater

Gallery

References 

Populated places in Overijssel
Hof van Twente